The National Museum of Natural History is the national natural history museum of the Philippines. It is located along Agrifina Circle in Rizal Park, Manila.

History

Agriculture and Commerce Building

The building was constructed as the Agriculture and Commerce Building in 1940. It was designed in a neoclassical style by Filipino Architect Antonio Toledo in the late 1930s, having the same dimensions and floor plan as its twin building located at the northern side of the circle, the Finance Building. Both buildings were destroyed in the Battle of Manila during World War II. Both buildings were reconstructed according to the original plans after the war.

Department of Tourism

At some point in time, the building was occupied by the Department of Tourism (DOT), hence the building became known as the Department of Tourism Building up until 2015. DOT moved its offices to the nearby city of Makati and is planning to return to Manila after the completion of its proposed headquarters located in Intramuros.

National Museum of Natural History

The National Museum Act, which was passed in 1998, mandates the conversion of three civic buildings within Rizal Park, the Legislative Building, the Finance Building, and the Tourism Building, into museums. The Finance Building was the first to be repurposed. In 1998, the building was converted into the National Museum of Anthropology. The Legislative Building was converted into the National Museum of Fine Arts in 2000. The Tourism Building would later become the National Museum of Natural History.

In 2013, preparations were commenced to have the building host the National Museum of Natural History. The National Museum of the Philippines invited five architects to submit proposals for the retrofitting and chose the design of the team from Dominic Galicia Architects and interior designer Tina Periquet. Galicia's design involved the maintenance of the building's facade except for the addition of a glass dome supported by a double helix structure inspired by DNA. The dome and supporting structure was dubbed as the "Tree of Life"  and will cover the courtyard of the six-storey building.

A bidding for prospective contractors for the renovation of the building was done in September 2015.

The National Museum of Natural History was officially inaugurated on September 30, 2017. A grand opening for the museum was expected in the later quarter of 2017. The museum opened on May 18, 2018.

Gallery

References

National Museum of the Philippines
Natural history
Buildings and structures in Ermita